Ofelia Irene Grabowski Edery (10 September 1936 – 16 June 1983), known professionally as Ofelia Montesco, was a Peruvian-born actress who is best remembered for her roles in cinema and television of Mexico. She was born in Iquitos City, in the Loreto Region of Peru, to Segismundo Pedro Grabowski and Julia Edery. In 1972, she portrayed Eugénie de Montijo, consort of Napoleon III, in the historical telenovela El carruaje.

Selected filmography 
The Life of Agustín Lara (1959)
Sube y baja (1959)
Santo vs. las Mujeres Vampiro (1962)
El ángel exterminador (1962)
El zurdo (1965)
Martín Romero El Rápido (1966)
Veinticuatro horas de placer (1969)

References

External links 

Peruvian film actresses
Peruvian emigrants to Mexico
People from Iquitos
1936 births
1983 deaths
Deaths from stomach cancer
20th-century Peruvian actresses
Peruvian telenovela actresses
Peruvian television actresses
Peruvian people of Polish descent
Deaths from cancer in Mexico